The WCW World Six-Man Tag Team Championship was a championship contested in World Championship Wrestling throughout 1991. It was considered a revived version of the NWA World Six-Man Tag Team Championship that was used in Jim Crockett Promotions; however, unlike the former version, which was often held by main eventers in between singles title feuds, this title was mostly used to push midcarders. The only men to win the title twice are Ricky Morton and Tommy Rich. It was abandoned in November 1991.

Months later, on the May 23 and 30 editions of WCW Magazine during WCW Worldwide, announcer Eric Bischoff mentioned that the Six-Man Tag Team Titles would be on the line at Beach Blast 1992, when Bobby Eaton, Arn Anderson and Steve Austin faced Barry Windham, Dustin Rhodes and Nikita Koloff. The idea to bring back the titles was apparently changed, as the match ended up a standard six-man tag match.

Reigns

Combined reigns

By wrestler

References

World Championship Wrestling championships
Trios wrestling tag team championships